Mariaholmen is an islet in Nathorst Land at the mouth of Van Mijenfjorden at Spitsbergen,  Svalbard. It is located south of Akseløya, between Akseløya and Måseneset. While Akselsundet north of Akseløya is regarded as the main entrance to Van Mijenfjorden, Mariasundet between Mariaholmen and Måseneset is also navigable.

Mariaholmen is composed of Upper Permian (Kapp Starostin Fm.) and Lower Triassic (Vardebukta Fm. and Tvillingodden Fm.) sedimentary deposits that have been stratigraphically tilted to a vertical position.

References

Islands of Svalbard
Spitsbergen